Ƽ (minuscule: ƽ) is a letter of the Latin alphabet used in the Zhuang alphabet from 1957 to 1986 to indicate its fifth tone, high-rising . In 1986 it was replaced by q.

It originates from an alteration of the numeral 5.

Computing codes

See also
Ƨ ƨ
З з
Ч ч
Ƅ ƅ

References

Latin-script letters
Romanization of Chinese